Walter Blankenburg (31 July 1903 – 10 March 1986) was a German Protestant pastor, director of church music and musicologist, who focused in several publications on liturgy, hymnology, and on the sacred music of the early Baroque period, especially by Johann Sebastian Bach.

Career 
Born in Emleben near Gotha, Blankenburg, the son of a pastor, studied theology, history and musicology at the University of Rostock. in Tübingen, Göttingen, Freiburg im Breisgau and Berlin. He was promoted to Ph.D. in 1943 in Göttingen with a dissertation about Die innere Einheit von Bachs Werk.

He was a member of the group preparing the Evangelisches Kirchengesangbuch from 1939 to 1949. He was director of the Kirchenmusikschule of the Evangelische Kirche von Kurhessen-Waldeck in Schlüchtern from its foundation in 1947 to his retirement in 1968. He was from 1941 to 1981 editor (Schriftleiter) of the magazine  (Music and church. He died in  Schlüchtern.

An award of the Protestant Church is named after him.

Publications 
 Kirche und Musik. Gesammelte Aufsätze zur Geschichte der gottesdienstlichen Musik, ed. Erich Hübner and Renate Steiger. Göttingen 1979.
 Das Weihnachts-Oratorium von Johann Sebastian Bach Bärenreiter 1999
 Einführung in Bachs H-moll-Messe, mit vollständigem Text Bärenreiter 1957

Sources 
 Nachlass Blankenburgs in University archove of Augsburg
 Hymnologische Sammlung Blankenburgs in the library of the University of Augsburg

Literature 
 Gerard Kappner:  Walter Blankenburg †. in:  1986, S. 124–125 
 Renate Steiger: Walter Blankenburg. In:  3/1986
 Franz Ganslandt: Jugendmusikbewegung und kirchenmusikalische Erneuerung. Impulse, Einflüsse, Wirkungen dargestellt in Verbindung mit Leben und Werk Walter Blankenburgs, Munich 1997. 
 100. Geburtstag von Walter Blankenburg am 31. Juli 2003, in: Quintett. Kirchenmusikalische Mitteilungen aus der Evangelischen Kirche von Kurhessen-Waldeck 5/2003, pp. 8–9.

References

External links 
 
 Walter Blankenburg University of Rostock
 Walter Blankenburg Bach Bibliography
 Theologische Bach-Studien I: Beiträge zur theologischen Bachforschung Taschenbuch – 1. Januar 1987 Walter Blankenburg Renate Steiger Carus-Verlag sgifashop.com

German theologians
German musicologists
Bach scholars
1903 births
1986 deaths
20th-century conductors (music)
Michael Praetorius scholars